Wintergreen is a group of aromatic plants, many in the genus Gaultheria.

Wintergreen may also refer to:

Plants
 Gaultheria, genus of shrubs commonly known as wintergreen
 Gaultheria procumbens, eastern teaberry or wintergreen
 Gaultheria humifusa, alpine wintergreen
 Gaultheria ovatifolia, western teaberry or Oregon spicy wintergreen
 Pyrola, genus of evergreen herbs commonly known as wintergreen
 Orthilia secunda, sidebells wintergreen, species formerly classed in genus Pyrola
 Moneses uniflora, the one-flowered wintergreen
 Chimaphila, prince's pine or wintergreen, a genus of flowering plants
 Chimaphila maculata, striped wintergreen
 Trientalis, a genus of flowering plants known as starflowers or wintergreens

Other uses 
 Wintergreen (band), an American band
 Wintergreen (book), a book by Robert Pyle
 Wintergreen (comics), a character in the Teen Titans comic
 Wintergreen (horse), an American Thoroughbred racehorse
 Wintergreen Resort, located in Virginia, United States
 Wintergreen Studios, off-grid education centre in Ontario, Canada
 ex-PFC Wintergreen, a fictional character from Joseph Heller's novel Catch-22
 Wintergreen, a presidential candidate in the play Of Thee I Sing 
 "Wintergreen", a song by That Handsome Devil from A City Dressed in Dynamite

See also
 Methyl salicylate, also known as oil of wintergreen
 Evergreen, plants that remain green throughout the year